Shelley Silas is a British playwright of Sephardi Jewish heritage. She grew up in Golders Green, North London. She is married to Stella Duffy, writer, campaigner, co-director of Fun Palaces.

Career
In 2002, she won a Pearson award and was writer-in-residence at London's Bush Theatre. Her stage plays are published by Oberon.

Her work for BBC Radio Four includes The Sound of Silence (short-listed for the 2003 Imison Award, creating and co-writing The Magpie Stories;, adapting Hanan al-Shaykh's novel Only in London and co-adapting Paul Scott's The Raj Quartet (with John Harvey).

She has also compiled and edited an anthology of short stories, 12 Days, published by Virago Press.

Stage plays
 Shrapnel (1999)
 Falling (2002)
 Calcutta Kosher (2004)
 Mercy Fine (2005)
 Eating Ice Cream on Gaza Beach (2008)

Radio plays
 The Sound of Silence (2002)
 The Magpie Stories (2002)
 Collective Fascination (2005)
 Ink (2005)
 Nothing Happened (2005, co-written with Luke Sorba)
 Molly's Story (2007)
 I Am Emma Humphreys (2009)
  The People Next Door (2010)
  Mr Jones Goes Driving (2010)
Comfort Girl (2014)
Dead Weight - Series 4 of Val McDermid's DEAD comedy crime series (2018)
Dead Cert - Series 5 of Val McDermid's DEAD comedy crime series (2019)
The Trial of The Well of Loneliness. (2020)

Radio adaptations
 Calcutta Kosher (2002)
 Only in London (2005)
 The Raj Quartet (2005)
Heat & Dust (2015)
VR SHORT  THE TURNING FOREST. Script for BBC R&D, Naked Prods, S3A, project in partnership to demonstrate immersive 3D sound.  Selected for the Experimental Storytelling programme for the 2016 Tribeca Festival Hub, VR. Oscar Raby, director and visuals.  Eloise Whitmore, soundscape.  Jon Nicholls, original score.  Subsequently chosen for MIFF (Melbourne International Film Festival), Pi Centre Montreal, Toronto International Film Festival, Edinburgh Digital Film Festival, Raindance Film Festival, London, I Love Transmedia Festival, Paris. Sydney Film Festival 2017. One of Wired.com’s eight favourite pieces at the Tribeca Film Festival. Achievement in Sound WINNER TVB Awards 2016. Chosen to launch Google Pixel and Daydream headset.  Google have nominated this for best VR Experience in the 2017 Play Awards.TV
  The Barkers'' Treatment commission, Monkey Kingdom

References

External links
List of Shelley's plays on Doollee
Participant in Pride London Festival Fortnight 2009. Event: Pride Spotlights at Drill Hall Chenies Street on 1 July
Radio plays listed on Diversity Website
 http://www.guardian.co.uk/world/2002/nov/14/gender.uk

1959 births
Living people
English dramatists and playwrights
British women dramatists and playwrights
Writers from London
English Sephardi Jews